Samarqand District is a district of Samarqand Region in Uzbekistan. The capital lies at Gulobod. The district was established in 1930.

Administrative divisions  
As of 2020, the district contains two urban-type settlements (Gulobod and Xoʻja Ahrori Vali) and 8 rural communities:

Ohalik
Qoʻshtamgʻali
Bogʻibaland
Dashtakibolo
Kattaqoʻrgʻonariq
Kulbaipoyon
Ulugʻbek
Qaynama

References

Samarqand Region
Districts of Uzbekistan